Versaugues is a commune in the Saône-et-Loire department in the region of Bourgogne-Franche-Comté in eastern France.

Geography
The Ruisseau de Sélore forms the commune's eastern and northern borders, then flows into the Arconce, which forms its western border.

See also
Communes of the Saône-et-Loire department

References

Communes of Saône-et-Loire